Hurlingham may refer to:

Places 

Hurlingham, Buenos Aires, a city in the Buenos Aires Province of Argentina
Hurlingham Partido, a department of Buenos Aires Province, Argentina
Hurlingham, a suburb of Johannesburg, South Africa
Hurlingham, a suburb of Nairobi, Kenya
Hurlingham Gardens, a suburb of Johannesburg, South Africa. It is located in Region B
Hurlingham the south part of Fulham, London, United Kingdom

Sports 

The Hurlingham Club, a sports club in the southwest of London, England, world headquarters of polo
The Hurlingham Club (Argentina), a sports and polo club in Argentina
Hurlingham Open, a polo competition in Argentina
Hurlingham Park, a multi-use stadium in Fulham, England
The Hurlingham Polo Association (HPA), the governing body for polo in the United Kingdom and Ireland
Hurlingham Club Ground, a cricket ground in Buenos Aires, Argentina
Hurlingham Trieste

Music 

Hurlinghum, Cyber, Chaka Place